Uncaged Campaigns is a Sheffield, UK, based anti-vivisection, not-for-profit organisation and a registered company limited by guarantee.

History
Uncaged Campaigns was established in 1993 by Angela Roberts and Lynn Williamson. They are a peaceful international animal protection organisation based in Sheffield, England. Their main campaigns are opposition to animal experiments and xenotransplantation, the global boycott of Procter & Gamble, and the positive promotion of animal rights and democratic action on animal issues through the political system. Dan Lyons was campaigns director until becoming the CEO of the Centre for Animals and Social Justice in 2011.

Activism
Uncaged aims include:

Notability
Uncaged are noted for their campaigns in the UK against vivisection and in particular their Global Boycott of Procter & Gamble due to the company's continued use of animal testing for cosmetics. This has taken the form of media campaigns resulting in TV and newspaper coverage. They achieved publicity by projecting the message "Procter & Gamble test on animals" onto the Angel Of The North statue in March 2006.

Uncaged also won the legal right to publish the "Diaries of Despair" report and over a thousand pages of confidential documents that describe in unique detail experiments involving the transplant of genetically modified pig organs into five hundred primates. The papers reveal researchers at the former biotechnology company, Imutran, exaggerated the success of work aimed at adapting pig organs for human transplant.

In July 2009 Uncaged, along with MPs and MEPs from across the political spectrum, presented the largest ever British animal protection petition with 1.5 million signatures to 10 Downing Street. The petition called on the British Government to develop a roadmap for the elimination of animal experimentation. Uncaged has also garnered support from British politicians including Norman Baker MP, Liberal Democrat. The Uncaged website quotes him, "Uncaged keeps alive the flame of hope that one day, animal experiments will seem as outdated as today sending children up chimneys seems."

Uncaged has always maintained a peaceful protest philosophy.

See also
List of animal rights groups

References

External links
Official Uncaged Campaigns website

Charities
United Kingdom
Organizations established in 1993
Animal rights organizations
Anti-vivisection movement